Wildlife HQ Zoo (formerly Queensland Zoo), is located at the Big Pineapple, Woombye, Queensland on the Sunshine Coast, Queensland and opened in November 2013.  In March 2014 many animals were relocated from the now closed Alma Park Zoo.

Opening hours

The zoo is open every day of the year except Christmas Day.  It is open between 9am and 4pm with the last entry at 3pm.

Animals

Wildlife HQ has a range of species from around the world. Currently eleven species of bird are kept at the zoo including red-tailed black cockatoos, sulphur-crested cockatoos, southern cassowaries, emu, laughing kookaburra and tawny frogmouths. The zoo currently has more than twenty-five exotic mammal species (including thirteen primate species presently) and continue to expand their species holdings. The zoo also houses several Australian species of mammals including koalas, wallabies, kangaroos, bettongs, potoroos, quokkas, a wombat and an echidna. The majority of the zoo’s reptile collection is exhibited in the ‘’Reptile Barn’’ which displays a diverse collection of non-venomous snakes, lizards and tortoises.

Complete species (and subspecies) list of animals at the zoo below.

Birds

Australian masked owl
Blue peafowl
Cape Barren goose
Eclectus parrot
Emu
Helmeted guineafowl
Laughing kookaburra
Red-tailed black cockatoo
Southern cassowary
Sulphur-crested cockatoo
Tawny frogmouth

Mammals

African wild dog
Alpaca
Bilby
Binturong
Black-and-white ruffed lemur
Blackbuck
Black-capped capuchin
Black-handed spider monkey
Bolivian squirrel monkey
Brush-tailed rock-wallaby
Cape porcupine
Capybara
Cotton-top tamarin
Dingo
Domestic guinea pig
Eastern grey kangaroo
Eastern quoll
Emperor tamarin
Fallow deer
Fennec fox
Golden lion tamarin
Goodfellow's tree-kangaroo
Hamadryas baboon
Koala
Long-nosed potoroo
Lumholtz's tree-kangaroo
Maned wolf
Meerkat
Miniature pony
Mountain brushtail possum
Northern white-cheeked gibbon
Pygmy marmoset
Quokka
Red-necked wallaby
Red kangaroo
Red panda
Ring-tailed lemur
Rufous bettong
Serval
Short-beaked echidna
Siamang
Southern hairy-nosed wombat
Squirrel glider
Sugar glider
Sun bear
Swamp wallaby
Tasmanian devil
White-tufted marmoset

Reptiles

Alligator snapping turtle
American alligator
Ball python
Black-headed python
Boa constrictor
Boyd's forest dragon
Burmese python
Central bearded dragon
Central netted dragon
Corn snake
Darwin carpet python
Diamond carpet python
Eastern blue-tongued lizard
Fijian crested iguana
Gilbert's lashtail dragon
Green iguana
Green tree python
Jungle carpet python
Lace monitor
Plumed basilisk
Radiated tortoise
Rhinoceros iguana
Saltwater crocodile
Shingleback lizard
Spencer's goanna
Spotted tree monitor
Woma python

Incidents
In April 2014, a tarantula was stolen from the zoo.

In May 2014, there were concerns that a local music festival would impact the animals at the zoo.

References

2013 establishments in Australia
Zoos established in 2013
Tourist attractions on the Sunshine Coast, Queensland
Zoos in Queensland